Shao-Ching Chiang (born November 10, 1993) is a Taiwanese professional baseball pitcher for the Fubon Guardians of the Chinese Professional Baseball League (CPBL). He has represented the Chinese Taipei national baseball team in international competitions.

Career

Cleveland Indians

Chiang signed as an international free agent with the Cleveland Indians organization. From 2012 through 2014, Chiang played for the Arizona League Indians, making just one appearance in each of his first two years. In 2014, he pitched in ten games (eight starts) and compiled a 4–2 win–loss record and a 4.53 earned run average (ERA). He spent 2015 with the Mahoning Valley Scrappers where he pitched to a 3–2 record and 3.92 ERA in nine games (eight starts), and 2016 with the Lake County Captains where he posted an 8–12 record and 3.96 ERA in 27 starts.

Chiang spent 2017 with the Lynchburg Hillcats and Akron RubberDucks where he pitched to a combined 9–10 record and 4.29 ERA in 25 total starts between both teams. In 2018, he split the season between Akron and the Columbus Clippers, going a combined 9–7 with a 3.90 with  innings pitched. He opened the 2019 season back with Columbus. He became a free agent following the 2019 season.

Detroit Tigers
On December 18, 2019, Chiang signed a minor league contract with the Detroit Tigers. Chiang did not play in a game in 2020 due to the cancellation of the minor league season because of the COVID-19 pandemic. He became a free agent on November 2, 2020.

Fubon Guardians
On February 25, 2021, Chiang agreed to a development contract with the Fubon Guardians of the Chinese Professional Baseball League. The team subsequently selected him first overall in the 2021 Chinese Professional Baseball League draft.

International career
Chiang represented Chinese Taipei at the 2014 Asian Games and 2017 World Baseball Classic. In the 2014 Asian Games in South Korea, winning a silver medal with Chinese Taipei. In the 2017 World Baseball Classic, he pitched  innings in one appearance against the Netherlands.

Chiang again represented Chinese Taipei in the 2019 WBSC Premier12 as a starting pitcher against Puerto Rico in the Opening Round, and against Mexico in the Super Round. In total, he pitched 11.2 innings with 13 strikeouts and ERA 2.31. His strong performance later attracted many MLB and NPB inquiries. He ultimately ended up in the Detroit Tigers minor league system.

References

External links

1993 births
Living people
Akron RubberDucks players
Arizona League Indians players
Asian Games silver medalists for Chinese Taipei
Asian Games medalists in baseball
Baseball pitchers
Baseball players at the 2014 Asian Games
Columbus Clippers players
Lake County Captains players
Lynchburg Hillcats players
Mahoning Valley Scrappers players
Medalists at the 2014 Asian Games
People from Hualien County
Taiwanese expatriate baseball players in the United States
2017 World Baseball Classic players
2023 World Baseball Classic players